

300001–300100 

|-id=082
| 300082 Moyocoanno ||  || Moyoco Anno (born 1971), a Japanese cartoonist and fashion writer || 
|}

300101–300200 

|-id=124
| 300124 Alessiazecchini ||  || Alessia Zecchini (born 1992), an Italian freediver, who set world and domestic records in free diving. || 
|-id=128
| 300128 Panditjasraj ||  || Pandit Jasraj (born 1930) is an exponent of Indian Classical vocal music. Jasraj is the recipient of numerous awards, honors, and titles including the prestigious Padma Vibhushan and the Sangeet Natak Akademi Award. His distinctive voice traverses a remarkable four-and-a-half octaves. || 
|-id=150
| 300150 Lantan ||  || Lan Tan, an elementary school by the Lan Lake side of the Chiayi City of Taiwan, is known for its natural science and astronomy education. It is also the location of Chia-Yi Amateur Astronomers Association. || 
|}

300201–300300 

|-id=221
| 300221 Brucebills ||  || Bruce G. Bills (born 1951), an American planetary scientist and director of JPL's "Asteroids, Comets, and Satellites Group" Scr || 
|-id=226
| 300226 Francocanepari ||  || Franco Canepari (born 1953) is the cofounder of Valdinievole Association of Astronomy A. Pieri. His major activity is devoted to the popularization of astronomy at the Planetarium of Monsummano Terme. He is also interested in observations of the Sun and planets. || 
|-id=286
| 300286 Zintun ||  || The Sun Moon Lake (Zintun), located in the middle of Taiwan, with an elevation of 748 meters above sea level, is the only natural big lake in Taiwan. The southern part of Lalu Island is shaped like a new moon, and the northern part is shaped like a sun; hence the name Sun Moon Lake. || 
|-id=300
| 300300 TAM ||  || The Taipei Astronomical Museum (abbreviated TAM) was the first and is the largest astronomy education and outreach organization in Taiwan. || 
|}

300301–300400 

|-id=334
| 300334 Antonalexander ||  || Anton Alexander König (born 2010), son of the discoverer, Michael König and Agathe Schmid-König from Germany || 
|}

300401–300500 

|-bgcolor=#f2f2f2
| colspan=4 align=center | 
|}

300501–300600 

|-bgcolor=#f2f2f2
| colspan=4 align=center | 
|}

300601–300700 

|-id=634
| 300634 Chuwenshin ||  || Chuwenshin (1883–1939), a Chinese astronomer, was a pioneer who used modern scientific methods to study the ancient history of Chinese astronomy systematically and wrote a variety of books on this topic. || 
|}

300701–300800 

|-bgcolor=#f2f2f2
| colspan=4 align=center | 
|}

300801–300900 

|-id=854
| 300854 Changyuin ||  || Changyuin (1896–1958) was a Chinese astronomer, who established the first educational observatory at Sun Yat-Sen University in China in 1929. He discovered the variable star XX Cam in 1947. || 
|-id=892
| 300892 Taichung ||  || Taichung, third largest city of Taiwan || 
|}

300901–301000 

|-id=909
| 300909 Kenthompson ||  || Ken Thompson (born 1943), an American pioneer of computer science || 
|-id=928
| 300928 Uderzo ||  || Albert Uderzo (born 1927) the co-creator of comic book character Asterix. || 
|-id=932
| 300932 Kyslyuk ||  || Vitalij Stepanovych Kyslyuk (1940–2014), a Ukrainian astronomer. || 
|}

References 

300001-301000